The Eastbourne Eagles were a British speedway team, based at Arlington Stadium, near Eastbourne, England, that raced in the SGB Championship.

History

Speedway was initially introduced to Eastbourne in 1929. During their first league season they were the 1947 Speedway National League Division Three champions. Despite winning the title at their first attempt they were forced to close down due to a petrol ban enforced at their Arlington Stadium. They decided to transfer their team to Hastings Saxons and at the beginning of 1948 the Speedway Control Board granted a licence to Hastings to stage speedway. Eastbourne would not compete again in the league until they joined the Southern Area League in 1954.

In 1957, they won the 1959 Southern Area League which was the second division league at the time but once again did not compete in league action for another decade. The Eagles returned for the 1969 British League Division Two season and two years later won their piece of silverware, winning the 1971 British League Division Two. The club won their first (of many) Knockout Cups in 1975.

In 1995, Eastbourne won their first highest league title, after they won the 1995 Premier League speedway season. The gulf in quality of teams was evident after the merging of the two leagues, with the Eagles winning the title 56 points clear of bottom club Exeter Falcons. Eastbourne had been an easy runner-up the previous year to runaway winners Poole Pirates and retained four of their riders Martin Dugard, Dean Barker, Stefan Dannö and Stefan Andersson, which provided enough firepower to seal the Championship.

They became the highest league champions for the second time after winning the 2000 Speedway Elite League. They were Elite League Knockout Cup winners in 2002 and again in 2008. The 2008 success was their fourth highest division Knockout Cup win. The Eagles competed in the Elite League until 2014 and the National League from 2015 until 2018.

In 2021, the Eagles competed in the SGB Championship 2021 (division 2) but withdrew from the league (on 26 August) because of financial problems. Their results were expunged as were the NDL results of their junior side called the Eastbourne Seagulls.

Notable former riders

Season summary

Season summary (juniors)

2021 season
the Seagulls were formed in February 2021 tand disbanded in August 2021. This was the junior side of the Eagles.
The Seagulls' first two signings for the season were Jake Knight and Richard Andrews, both returning to Arlington having ridden for the Eagles when they were in the National League. Club asset, and local youngster, Nathan Ablitt was then confirmed as one of the Seagulls' reserves starting on a 3.00 average. The Seagulls then completed the signings of Chad Wirtzfeld and Connor King, who both had previous National League experience with the Isle of Wight Warriors. Henry Atkins became the Seagulls' sixth signing, he raced for the Seagulls alongside riding for his SGB Championship team, the Plymouth Gladiators. Another local rider, Nick Laurence, was named as the Seagulls' second reserve and their final signing.

Riders previous seasons

2021 team
 Richard Lawson
 Edward Kennett
 Lewis Kerr
 Tom Brennan
 Kyle Newman
 Drew Kemp
 Nathan Ablitt

2019 team
 Edward Kennett
 Richard Lawson
 Lewis Kerr
 Kyle Newman
 Georgie Wood
 Alfie Bowtell
 Jason Edwards
 Tom Brennan 
 Ben Morley 

2018 team
 Georgie Wood
 Mark Baseby
 Tom Brennan
 Jason Edwards
 Ethan Spiller
 Charley Powell
 Charlie Brooks
 Kelsey Dugard 

2017 team

 Josh Bailey
 Jake Knight
 Georgie Wood
 Tom Brennan
 Charley Powell
 Mattie Bates
 Charlie Saunders
 Kelsey Dugard 
 Connor Coles 
 Matt Saul 
 Mark Baseby 

2016 team

 Adam Ellis
 Jake Knight
 Ellis Perks
 Georgie Wood
 Gary Cottham
 Charley Powell
 Luke Harris

2015 team

 Bradley Wilson-Dean
 Ben Hopwood
 Marc Owen
 Daniel Spiller
 Georgie Wood
 Richard Andrews
 Kelsey Dugard

2014 team

 Bjarne Pedersen
 Cameron Woodward
 Joonas Kylmäkorpi
 Mikkel Michelsen
 Timo Lahti
 Lewis Blackbird
 Danny Halsey

2013 team

 Bjarne Pedersen
 Cameron Woodward
 Lukáš Dryml
 Kim Nilsson
 Simon Gustafsson
 Mikkel Michelsen
 Timo Lahti

2012 team

 Joonas Kylmäkorpi
 Simon Gustafsson
 Timo Lahti
 Lewis Bridger
 Cameron Woodward
 Lukáš Dryml
 Denis Gizatullin

Notes

See also
Hastings Saxons

References

Speedway Elite League teams
SGB Championship teams
National League speedway teams
Sport in Eastbourne